Kunming railway station is the main railway station serving the city of Kunming, Yunnan, China. It is located about four kilometres from the city centre. On March 1, 2014, a group of men and women carrying long knives rushed into Kunming Station, killed 33 people and injured 143.

Connections
Kunming railway station is located on the Shanghai–Kunming Railway, the Chengdu–Kunming Railway, the Neijiang–Kunming Railway and the Nanning–Kunming Railway. It is also served by a station on Line 1 of the Kunming Metro.

Other railway stations in Kunming
Kunming also has the Kunming North railway station (昆明北站), on the meter-gauge Kunming–Hai Phong Railway. Presently (2012), it has only very limited service. Kunming also has a railway station called Kunming South railway station located in Chenggong District and is used for high-speed rail services.

2014 terrorist attack

On March 1, 2014, a group of terrorists carrying long knives rushed into Kunming Station, killing 31 people and injuring 143. Later, the police came and secured the scene of the attack. Four attackers were shot dead.

Notes and references

External links

Railway stations in Yunnan
Railway stations in China opened in 1966
Stations on the Shanghai–Kunming Railway
Transport in Kunming
1966 establishments in China